Wojciechowski  (feminine: Wojciechowska ; plural Wojciechowscy ) is the 16th most common surname in Poland (66,879 people in 2009) and also the third most common in Greater Poland (12,928). It is derived from the Polish first name Wojciech.

Over 50% of Poles with this surname live in Greater Poland, Mazovia and Kujawy.

Notable people
 Antoni Wojciechowski (1905–1938), Polish chess master
 Asher Wojciechowski (born 1988), American baseball player
 Dariusz Wojciechowski (born 1968), Polish cyclist
 Gene Wojciechowski, American sportswriter
 Greg Wojciechowski (born 1951), American wrestler
 Maia Wojciechowska (1927–2002), Polish-American novelist
 John Wojciechowski (born 1963), American football player
 Julia Wojciechowska (1915–1986), Polish gymnast
 Kazimierz Wojciechowski (1904–1941), Polish Catholic clergyman
 Martyna Wojciechowska (born 1974), Polish journalist
 Mathieu Wojciechowski, French basketball player
 Oliwier Wojciechowski, Polish footballer
 Paweł Wojciechowski (disambiguation), multiple individuals
 Sergei Wojciechowski (1883–1951), Russian White Army Major-General
 Stanisław Wojciechowski (1869–1953), President of Poland 1922–26
 Steve Wojciechowski (born 1976), American basketball player and coach
 Steve Wojciechowski (ice hockey) (born 1922), Canadian ice hockey player
 Tytus Woyciechowski (1808–1879), Polish politician
 Ziemowit Wojciechowski, Polish fencer
 Zofia Wojciechowska-Grabska (1905–1992), Polish painter
 Zygmunt Wojciechowski (1900–1955), Polish historian

See also
 
 
 Wojciech, a Polish given name
 Wojciechów (disambiguation)

References

Polish-language surnames